The Golf Tour of New Zealand was a New Zealand-based golf tour which ran from 2004 to 2007. It was founded by Greg Turner. It was superseded by the Charles Tour. Tournaments were over 72 holes.

The first event on the tour was the Taranaki Open in late 2004. The Taranaki Open was the only event in 2004 and 2005 but was joined by the Tauranga Open and the Wairakei Open in 2006. These three events, together with the AMP Open at Titirangi were played in 2007. In 2007 there was a dispute between the tour and the New Zealand PGA, which meant the Golf Tour of New Zealand withdrew their support for the Wairakei Open and, possibly, Taranaki Open, and the AMP Open was run without the sanction of the NZPGA. The tour was replaced by the Charles Tour which started in 2008.

Tournaments

Notes

References

Golf in New Zealand
Professional golf tours